Wallace Maynard Cox (December 6, 1924 – February 15, 1973) was an American actor. He began his career as a standup comedian and then became the title character of the popular early U.S. television series Mister Peepers from 1952 to 1955.  He also appeared as a character actor in over 20 films and dozens of television episodes. Cox was the voice of the animated canine superhero Underdog of the TV show of the same name.

Early life, education, and career beginnings
Cox was born on December 6, 1924, in Detroit, Michigan. When he was 10, he moved with his divorced mother, mystery author Eleanor Blake, and a younger sister to Evanston, Illinois, where he became close friends with another child in the  neighborhood, Marlon Brando. His family moved several times, including a move to New York City, and Cox graduated from Denby High School after they returned to Detroit.

During World War II, Cox and his family returned to New York City, where he attended City College of New York. He next spent four months in the United States Army, and on his discharge attended New York University. He supported his invalid mother and sister by making and selling jewelry in a small shop, and entertaining at parties doing comedy monologues. These led to regular performances at nightclubs, such as the Village Vanguard, beginning in December 1948.

He became the roommate of Brando, who encouraged him to study acting with Stella Adler.

Career

In 1949, Cox appeared on the CBS network-radio show Arthur Godfrey's Talent Scouts, to the great amusement of host Godfrey. The first half of his act was a monologue in a slangy, almost-mumbled punk-kid characterization, telling listeners about his friend Dufo: "What a crazy guy." The gullible oaf Dufo would take any dares and fall for his gang's pranks time after time, and Cox would recount the awful consequences: "Sixteen stitches. What a crazy guy." Just as the studio audience had reached a peak of laughter, Cox suddenly switched gears, changed characters, and sang a high-pitched version of "The Drunkard Song" ("There Is a Tavern in the Town") punctuated by eccentric yodels. "Wallace Cox" earned a big hand that night, but lost by a narrow margin to The Chordettes; yet he made enough of a hit to record his radio routine for an RCA Victor single. The "Dufo" routine ("What a Crazy Guy") was paired with "Tavern in the Town."

He appeared in Broadway musical reviews, night clubs, and early television comedy-variety programs between 1949 and 1951, including the short-lived (January–April 1949) DuMont series The School House and CBS Television's Faye Emerson's Wonderful Town. He appeared on the Goodyear Television Playhouse in 1951, starring in the comedy episode "The Copper" as the titular policeman.  Series producer Fred Coe approached Cox about a starring role in a proposed live television sitcom, Mister Peepers, which he accepted. The show ran on NBC Television for three years. During this time, he guest-starred on NBC's The Martha Raye Show.

Billboard magazine chronicled Cox's spectacular rise in booking fees: in the late 1940s, $75/wk at New York's Village Vanguard, then $125 at the Blue Angel; $250/wk in Broadway's "Dance Me a Song" revue in 1950, then the Persian Room for $500/wk. The eight-year pact he signed with NBC in late 1952 paid him $100,000 for 1953.

In 1953, Cox's comedy sketches were featured in The Ford 50th Anniversary Show, a program that was broadcast live on both NBC and CBS. Cox's four sketches consisted of a man trying to improve his physique, an expert on relaxation methods, techniques that allowed him to change from wallflower to popularity, and learning to dance. The program attracted an audience of 60 million viewers. Forty years after the broadcast, television critic Tom Shales recalled it as both "a landmark in television" and "a milestone in the cultural life of the '50s".

In 1959, Cox was featured in the guest-starring title role in The Vincent Eaglewood Story on NBC's Western series Wagon Train. He played a prominent supporting role as Preacher Goodman in Spencer's Mountain (1963), a Navy sonar man in The Bedford Incident (1964), and a drug-addicted doctor opposite Marlon Brando in the World War II suspense film Morituri (1965).

Other roles were as the hero of The Adventures of Hiram Holliday, based on a series of short stories by Paul Gallico and co-starring with Ainslie Pryor. He was a regular occupant of the upper left square on the television game show Hollywood Squares, and voiced the animated cartoon character Underdog. He also was a guest on the game show What's My Line? and on the pilot episodes of Mission: Impossible and It Takes a Thief. Cox made several appearances on Here's Lucy, as well as The Beverly Hillbillies, Lost in Space, I Spy, and evening talk shows. He played a pickpocket in an episode of Car 54, Where Are You?. He also appeared on The Twilight Zone, season five, episode number 140, titled "From Agnes—With Love".

He played character roles in more than 20 motion pictures and worked frequently in guest-star roles in television drama, comedy, and variety series in the 1960s and early 1970s. These include a supporting role in the 20th Century Fox´s unfinished film Something's Got to Give (1962), the last film of Marilyn Monroe. He was cast in a role as a down-on-his-luck prospector seeking a better life for his family in an episode of Alias Smith and Jones, a Western comedy; and in Up Your Teddy Bear (aka Mother) (1970), he starred with Julie Newmar. His television and screen persona was that of a shy, timid, but kind man who wore thick eyeglasses and spoke in a pedantic, high-pitched voice.

Cox wrote a number of books, including Mister Peepers: A Sort of Novel, co-written with William Redfield, which was created by adapting several scripts from the television series; My Life as a Small Boy, an idealized depiction of his childhood; a parody and update of Horatio Alger in Ralph Makes Good, which was probably originally a screen treatment for an unmade film intended to star Cox; and a children's book, The Tenth Life of Osiris Oakes.

Personal life
In a 1950s article on Cox's series Mister Peepers, Popular Science  reported that Cox kept a small workshop in his dressing room. (Cox's Hollywood Squares colleague Peter Marshall recalled in his memoir Backstage with the Original Hollywood Square that Cox installed and maintained all the wiring in his own home.)

While he mostly maintained a meek onscreen persona, TV viewers did get to see a glimpse of Cox's physicality on an episode of I've Got a Secret, aired on May 11, 1960, in which he and host Garry Moore ran around on stage assembling furniture while the panel was blindfolded. On the May 15, 1974, installment of The Tonight Show, actor Robert Blake spoke of how much he missed his good friend Cox, who was described as being adventurous and athletic. Cox married three times—to Marilyn Gennaro, Milagros Tirado, and Patricia Tiernan—and was survived by his third wife and his two children.

Cox and Marlon Brando remained close friends throughout Cox's life, and Brando appeared unannounced at Cox's wake. Brando is also reported to have kept Cox's ashes in his bedroom and conversed with them nightly. Their close friendship was the subject of rumors. Brando told a journalist: "If Wally had been a woman, I would have married him and we would have lived happily ever after." Writer-editor Beauregard Houston-Montgomery said that while under the influence of marijuana, Brando told him that Cox had been the love of his life.

A Democrat, he supported the campaign of Adlai Stevenson during the 1952 presidential election.

Death
Cox was found dead on February 15, 1973, in his home in Hollywood, California, at age 48. According to an autopsy, Cox died of a heart attack caused by a coronary occlusion. Initial reports indicated that he wished to have no funeral and that his ashes be scattered at sea. A later report indicated his ashes were put in with those of Brando and another close friend, Sam Gilman, and scattered in Death Valley and Tahiti.

Partial filmography 

 The Sniper (1952) as Man Pressing Clothes at Dry Cleaners (uncredited)
 The Ford 50th Anniversary Show (1953)
 Wagon Train The Vincent Englewood Story (teacher) 1959
 State Fair (1962) as Hipplewaite
 Car 54 Where Are You? - "No More Pickpockets" (1962) as Benny
 Something's Got to Give (unfinished Marilyn Monroe film, 1962) as Shoe Salesman
 Spencer's Mountain (1963) as Preacher Clyde Goodman
 The Twilight Zone – "From Agnes—With Love" (1964) as James Elwood
 Fate is the Hunter (1964) as Ralph Bundy
 Underdog (1964 – 1967) - Underdog (voice)
 The Yellow Rolls-Royce (1964) as Ferguson
 Morituri (1965) as Dr. Ambach
 The Bedford Incident (1965) as Seaman Merlin Queffle
 The Beverly Hillbillies (1966) as Professor P. Caspar Biddle
 Lost in Space Forbidden World (1966) as Tiabo
 A Guide for the Married Man (1967) as Technical Adviser (Married 14 years)
 The One and Only, Genuine, Original Family Band (1968) as Mr. Wampler
 Quarantined (1970) as Wilbur Mott
 The Young Country (1970) as Aaron Grimes/Ira Greebe
 The Cockeyed Cowboys of Calico County (1970) as Mr. Bester
 The Boatniks (1970) as Jason
 Up Your Teddy Bear (1970) as Clyde King
 The Barefoot Executive (1971) as Mertons
 The Night Strangler (1973) as Mr. Berry

References

External links

 
 
 
 
 
 Watch Wally Cox in The Copper

1924 births
1973 deaths
American male television actors
American male voice actors
Donaldson Award winners
RCA Victor artists
Male actors from Detroit
Male actors from Evanston, Illinois
Military personnel from Detroit
United States Army soldiers
20th-century American male actors
California Democrats
Illinois Democrats
Denby High School alumni
United States Army personnel of World War II